Upper and lower probabilities are representations of imprecise probability. Whereas probability theory uses a single number, the probability, to describe how likely an event is to occur, this method uses two numbers: the upper probability of the event and the lower probability of the event.

Because frequentist statistics disallows metaprobabilities,  frequentists have had to propose new solutions. Cedric Smith and Arthur Dempster each developed a theory of upper and lower probabilities. Glenn Shafer developed Dempster's theory further, and it is now known as Dempster–Shafer theory or Choquet (1953).
More precisely, in the work of these authors one considers in a power set,  a mass function  satisfying the conditions

In turn, a mass is associated with two non-additive continuous measures called belief  and plausibility defined as follows:

In the case where  is infinite there can be  such that there is no associated mass function. See p. 36 of Halpern (2003). Probability measures are a special case of belief functions in which the mass function assigns positive mass to singletons of the event space only.

A different notion of upper and lower probabilities is obtained by the lower and upper envelopes obtained from a class C of probability distributions by setting
 

The upper and lower probabilities are also related with probabilistic logic: see Gerla (1994).

Observe also that a necessity measure can be seen as a lower probability and a possibility measure can be seen as an upper probability.

See also
Possibility theory
Fuzzy measure theory
Interval finite element
Probability bounds analysis

References
 
 
 
 
 
 
 
 

Exotic probabilities
Probability bounds analysis
Dempster–Shafer theory